Psalm 128 is the 128th psalm of the Book of Psalms, beginning in English in the King James Version: "Blessed is every one that feareth the ; that walketh in his ways". In Latin, it is known as "Beati omnes qui timent Dominum".

In the slightly different numbering system used in the Greek Septuagint and the Latin Vulgate, this psalm is Psalm 127.

The psalm forms a regular part of Jewish, Catholic, Lutheran, Anglican and other Protestant liturgies.

Text

Hebrew Bible version 
Following is the Hebrew text of Psalm 128:

King James Version 
¹Blessed is every one that feareth the LORD;
  that walketh in his ways.
²For thou shalt eat the labour of thine hands:
  happy shalt thou be, and it shall be well with thee.
³Thy wife shall be as a fruitful vine
  by the sides of thine house:
thy children like olive plants
  round about thy table.
⁴Behold, that thus shall the man be blessed
  that feareth the LORD.
⁵The LORD shall bless thee out of Zion:
    and thou shalt see the good of Jerusalem
  all the days of thy life.
⁶Yea, thou shalt see thy children's children,
  and peace upon Israel.

Theme 
Written anonymously, Psalm 128 likely dates to the post-exilic period (that is, after about 539 BCE).

The Jamieson-Fausset-Brown Bible Commentary describes  as a "virtual commentary on this psalm".

Verse 6
May you see your children’s children! Peace be upon Israel!
This verse recalls Jacob's reunion with his son Joseph in : And Israel [Jacob] said to Joseph, "I had not thought to see your face; but in fact, God has also shown me your offspring!" and is reflected in Job's restoration: After this Job lived one hundred and forty years, and saw his children and grandchildren for four generations. Proverbs 17:6 celebrates the same idea: Children’s children are the crown of old men.

The concluding prayer for peace upon Israel, which also appears in Psalm 125, is best taken as a "detached clause", according to the Pulpit Commentary.

Uses

Judaism 
In traditional Jewish practice, this psalm is recited following Mincha between Sukkot and Shabbat Hagadol. It is also recited prior to Aleinu during Motzei Shabbat Maariv, and among the prayers of the Bedtime Shema. Its second verse is found in Pirkei Avot Chapter 4, no. 1 and Chapter 6, no. 4.

Christianity 
Traditionally, since the Middle Ages, this psalm has been recited within the Office of none from Tuesday until Saturday, according to the Rule of St. Benedict (530).

In the liturgy of the current Roman Rite Mass, Psalm 128 is used on the feast of the Holy Family, the 33rd Sunday in Ordinary Time of the year A and the 27th Sunday in Ordinary Time of the year B. It is also the traditional psalm for nuptial masses (missa pro votiva sponso and sponsa).

In the Sarum Use, the psalm was also sung by the priest after Psalm 121 at the churching of women.

Music 
This psalm was used by Michel-Richard Delalande in 1698 to compose a grand motet (S51) which was played in the royal chapel of Versailles to celebrate the offices. Henry Desmarest composed a grand motet "Beati omnes" (unknown date). Marc-Antoine Charpentier composed in 1680/1681 one "Beati omnes qui timent Dominum" H.178, for 3 voices, 2 treble instruments and continuo.

Salamone Rossi, the 17th-century Jewish-Italian composer who was the first known composer to write choral music for the Jewish liturgy, published three settings of the psalm (for 3, 5, and 6 voices) in his collection Shir Ha'shirim Lishlomo, published in 1622.

References

External links 

 
 
 Text of Psalm 128 according to the 1928 Psalter
 Psalms Chapter 128 text in Hebrew and English, mechon-mamre.org
 A song of ascents. / Blessed are all who fear the LORD, and who walk in his ways. text and footnotes, usccb.org United States Conference of Catholic Bishops
 Psalm 128:1 introduction and text, biblestudytools.com
 Psalm 128 – The Blessed Family of Those Who Fear the LORD enduringword.com
 Psalm 128 / Refrain: How abundant is your goodness, O Lord. Church of England
 Psalm 128 at biblegateway.com
 Charles H. Spurgeon: Psalm 128 detailed commentary, archive.spurgeon.org
 

128